The following are the football (soccer) events of the year 1912 throughout the world.

Events
For goalkeepers handling the ball is being restricted to their boxes; previously it was their own half, where goalkeepers were permitted to handle the ball.
 Swansea City F.C. is founded.

Winners club national championship 
Argentina: Estudiantil Porteño, Quilmes Athletic Club
Austria: Rapid Vienna
Belgium: Daring CB
England: Blackburn Rovers
Germany: FV Holstein Kiel
Hungary: Ferencváros
Iceland: KR
Italy: Pro Vercelli
Luxembourg: US Hollerich
Netherlands: Sparta Rotterdam
Paraguay: Olimpia
Romania: United Ploiești
Scotland: For fuller coverage, see 1911-12 in Scottish football.
Scottish Division One – Rangers
Scottish Division Two – Ayr United
Scottish Cup – Celtic
Sweden: Djurgårdens IF
Uruguay: Nacional
Greece: F.C. Goudi Athens

International tournaments
 1912 British Home Championship (February 10 – April 13, 1912)
Shared by  & 
 
Olympic Games in Stockholm, Sweden (June 29 – July 5, 1912)
  Great Britain

Births
 May 13 – Willy Jürissen, German international footballer (died 1990)
 August 3 – Otto Siffling, German international footballer (died 1939)
 September 21 – Mario Zatelli, French international footballer and manager (died 2004)

Deaths

References 

 
Association football by year